Ünür is a village in the Çankırı District of Çankırı Province in Turkey. Its population is 843 (2021). Before the 2013 reorganisation, it was a town (belde).

References

Villages in Çankırı District